Haritalodes is a genus of moths of the family Crambidae.

Species
Haritalodes adjunctalis Leraut, 2005
Haritalodes amboinensis Leraut, 2005
Haritalodes angustalis Yamanaka, 2009
(Haritalodes annuligeralis (Walker, 1866)) (mostly treated as a synonym Haritalodes derogata)
Haritalodes barbuti Leraut, 2005
(Haritalodes basipunctalis (Bremer, 1864)) (mostly treated as a Haritalodes derogata)
Haritalodes derogata (Fabricius, 1775)
Haritalodes levequei Leraut, 2005
Haritalodes mineti Leraut, 2005
Haritalodes polycymalis (Hampson, 1912)
Haritalodes pseudoderogata (Strand, 1920)

References

Spilomelinae
Crambidae genera
Taxa named by William Warren (entomologist)